The Medical Association for Prevention of War (Australia) is a professional not-for-profit organisation which has promoted peace and disarmament since its foundation in 1981. The organisation is apolitical, and utilises research, consultation, advocacy, education and partnership strategies to pursue its objectives- to reduce the physical, psychological and environmental impacts of war worldwide. Also known as MAPW, the organisation has branches in each of Australia's states and territories. In 1986, MAPW was awarded an Australian Peace Prize, presented by then Prime Minister Bob Hawke.

Affiliations 
MAPW is the Australian affiliate of International Physicians for the Prevention of Nuclear War.

References 

Peace organisations based in Australia
Medical associations based in Australia